Melisa Miranda-Otarola (born 28 April 1988) is a Chilean former professional tennis player.

Born in Santiago, Miranda played in the Fed Cup for Chile from 2005 to 2009. She featured in a total of eleven ties for her country and won eight of her nine singles rubbers. In addition to the Fed Cup, she also represented Chile at the 2007 Pan American Games.

Miranda, a right-handed player, reached a best singles ranking of 447 on the professional tour. She made her only WTA Tour main-draw appearance at the 2008 Cachantún Cup in Viña del Mar, as a local wildcard in the women's singles. Both of her two ITF title wins also came in 2008.

ITF finals

Singles (2–1)

Doubles (0–4)

References

External links
 
 
 

1988 births
Living people
Chilean female tennis players
Tennis players from Santiago
Pan American Games competitors for Chile
Tennis players at the 2007 Pan American Games
20th-century Chilean women
21st-century Chilean women